The 2001 Tour de France was a multiple-stage bicycle race held from 7 to 29 July, and the 88th edition of the Tour de France. It has no overall winner—although American cyclist Lance Armstrong originally won the event, the United States Anti-Doping Agency announced in August 2012 that they had disqualified Armstrong from all his results since 1998, including his seven Tour de France wins from 1999 to 2005. The verdict was subsequently confirmed by the Union Cycliste Internationale.

The race included a  team time trial, two individual time trials and five consecutive mountain-top finishing stages, the second of which was the Chamrousse special-category climb time trial. Thus, all the high-mountain stages were grouped consecutively, following the climbing time trial, with one rest day in between.  France was ridden 'clockwise', so the Alps were visited before the Pyrenees. The Tour started in France but also visited Belgium in its first week. The ceremonial final stage finished at the Champs-Élysées in Paris, as is tradition. Erik Zabel won his record sixth consecutive points classification victory. This was a record for points classification victories and is still a record for most consecutive victories, however Peter Sagan now holds the record for most total green jersey wins with seven.

Teams

The organisers felt that the 2000 Tour de France had not included enough French teams and consequently changed the selection procedure.  was selected because it included the winner of the previous edition, Lance Armstrong.  was selected because it included the winner of the 2000 UCI Road World Cup, Erik Zabel).  was selected because it won the team classification in the 2000 Giro d'Italia.  was selected because it won the team classifications in both the 2000 Tour de France and 2000 Vuelta a España. A further twelve teams qualified based on the UCI ranking in the highest UCI division at the end of 2000, after compensating for transfers. Although initially it was announced that four wildcards would be given, the tour organisation decided to add five teams: In total, 21 teams participated, each with 9 cyclists, giving a total of 189 cyclists.

The teams entering the race were:

Qualified teams

Invited teams

Route and stages

Race overview

It was during this Tour de France that Johan Bruyneel, the Directeur Sportif of the US Postal team, intentionally mislead other teams about the condition of his riders through race radio, in an attempt to get opponents to believe his riders were suffering more than they actually were. This Tour is also noted for The Look, which became one of the more misinterpreted moments in cycling history.

Doping

After Armstrong abandoned his fight against the United States Anti-Doping Agency (USADA), he was stripped of his record seven Tour de France titles. The Union Cycliste Internationale endorsed the USADA sanctions and decided not to award victories to any other rider or upgrade other placings in any of the affected events. The 2001 Tour therefore has no official winner.

Classification leadership and minor prizes

There were several classifications in the 2001 Tour de France. The most important was the general classification, calculated by adding each cyclist's finishing times in each stage. The cyclist with the least accumulated time was the race leader, identified by the yellow jersey; the winner of this classification is considered the winner of the Tour.

Additionally, there was a points classification, which awarded a green jersey. In this classification, cyclists got points for finishing among the best in a stage finish, or in intermediate sprints. The cyclist with the most points lead the classification and was identified with a green jersey.

There was also a mountains classification. The organisation had categorised some climbs as either hors catégorie, first, second, third, or fourth-category; points for this classification were won by the first cyclists to reach the top of these climbs, with more points available for the higher-categorised climbs. The cyclist with the most points lead the classification and wore a white jersey with red polka dots.

The fourth individual classification was the young rider classification, which was marked by the white jersey. This was decided in the same way as the general classification, but only riders under 26 years of age were eligible.

For the team classification, the times of the best three cyclists per team on each stage were added; the leading team was the team with the lowest total time.

In addition, there was a combativity award given after each mass-start stage to the cyclist considered most combative, who wore a red number bib the next stage. The decision was made by a jury composed of journalists who gave points. The cyclist with the most points from votes in all stages led the combativity classification. Laurent Jalabert won this classification, and was given overall the super-combativity award.

There were also two special awards each with a prize of F 20,000, the Souvenir Henri Desgrange, given in honour of Tour founder and first race director Henri Desgrange to the first rider to pass the summit of the Col de la Madeleine on stage 10, and the Souvenir Jacques Goddet, given for the first time in honour of the second director Jacques Goddet to the first rider to pass the summit of the Col du Tourmalet on stage 14. Laurent Roux won the Henri Desgrange and Sven Montgomery won the Jacques Goddet.

In stage 1, Igor González de Galdeano wore the green jersey.
In stages 8 and 9, Erik Zabel wore the green jersey.

Final standings

General classification

Points classification

Mountains classification

Young rider classification

Team classification

Combativity classification

Notes

References

Bibliography

Further reading

External links

 
 2001 Tour de France at Cyclingnews.com

 
Tour de France by year
Tour de France
Tour de France
Tour de France
Tour de France